Athletes from the West Indies Federation competed under the name Antilles (ANT), renamed to British West Indies (BWI) by the IOC, at the 1960 Summer Olympics in Rome, Italy. Thirteen competitors—two from Barbados, four from Trinidad, and seven from Jamaica—all men, took part in thirteen events in five sports. The short-lived nation only participated at these single Games, as Jamaica and Trinidad and Tobago competed independently again in 1964, and Barbados started competing at the 1968 Games.  The team won two bronze medals, both in track and field athletics.

Participation

Timeline of participation

Medal tables

Medals by Summer Games

Medals by summer sport

List of medalists

Results by event

Athletics

Cycling

Sailing

Shooting

Weightlifting

References

External links
 
 
 
 Official Olympic Reports

Nations at the 1960 Summer Olympics
1960
1960
1960
1960 in Barbados
1960 in Jamaican sport
1960 in Trinidad and Tobago
Oly
West Indies Federation
1960 in Caribbean sport